Lower Mifflin Township is a township in Cumberland County, Pennsylvania, United States. The population was 1,783 at the 2010 census.

Geography
The township is in northwestern Cumberland County, bordered to the north by Perry County. The county boundary follows the crest of Blue Mountain, which in this area makes a large double bend known as Doubling Gap. Colonel Denning State Park is located within the bend, in the valley of Doubling Gap Creek, which flows south out of the mountain area and across the township to Conodoguinet Creek, which forms the southern boundary of the township and is a tributary of the Susquehanna River.

The Pennsylvania Turnpike (Interstate 76) crosses the southern end of the township, but with no direct access.

Demographics
As of the census of 2000, there were 1,620 people, 586 households, and 471 families residing in the township. The racial makeup of the township was 98.77% White, 0.56% African American, 0.06% from other races, and 0.62% from two or more races. Hispanic or Latino of any race were 0.68% of the population.

There were 586 households, out of which 39.1% had children under the age of 18 living with them, 70.1% were married couples living together, 6.0% had a female householder with no husband present, and 19.5% were non-families. 15.5% of all households were made up of individuals, and 6.3% had someone living alone who was 65 years of age or older.  The average household size was 2.76 and the average family size was 3.06.

In the township the population was spread out, with 28.7% under the age of 18, 7.0% from 18 to 24, 31.4% from 25 to 44, 23.1% from 45 to 64, and 9.8% who were 65 years of age or older.  The median age was 36 years. For every 100 females, there were 98.8 males.  For every 100 females age 18 and over, there were 95.4 males.

The median income for a household in the township was $42,578, and the median income for a family was $43,846. Males had a median income of $31,528 versus $23,047 for females. The per capita income for the township was $17,687.  About 5.1% of families and 5.7% of the population were below the poverty line, including 3.3% of those under age 18 and 14.1% of those age 65 or over.

References

Harrisburg–Carlisle metropolitan statistical area
Townships in Cumberland County, Pennsylvania
Townships in Pennsylvania